or  is a valley in the municipality of Rana in Nordland county, Norway. It is a side valley of the Dunderland Valley, and is located in the Saltfjellet mountains, within the Saltfjellet–Svartisen National Park. The river Bjøllåga flows through the valley. The old road across Saltfjellet passed through Bjøllådalen.

References

Valleys of Nordland
Rana, Norway